R\West is an American advertising agency based in Portland, Oregon that provides marketing, public relations, and related services.  They are best known for the Trunk Monkey commercials, which they created in collaboration with Limbo Films for Suburban Auto Group. The agency gained national attention as dealerships across the U.S. licensed the ads. They also received some negative publicity from animal rights activists over their use of a trained chimpanzee.

R\West is also notable for designing an award-winning kids' meal program for the fast food chain Burgerville.  The program received the Grand Award in the 2004 Best Kids' Menu in America Competition.  Through comic books, games and toys, young diners learn about locally grown food and natural resources in the Pacific Northwest.

The company was founded in 1997 as Big Ads, and later changed its name to R\West.  According to President Sean Blixseth (not to be confused with lawyer Sean Reed Blixseth), the 'R' in R\West stands for the messenger Revere, symbolizing the company's role as a messenger for its clients.

Clients (list is not expansive)
Teachers Federal Credit Union
Fetzer Vineyards 
Overlake Hospital Medical Center 
OHSU Foundation 
Flir
Raymarine 
Demarini 
Bonne Maman
Walkers Shortbread International 
Sorel
Burgerville
Oregon Museum of Science and Industry
Taco Time

Awards
 2007: two Emmys from The Northwest Chapter of the National Academy of Television Arts and Sciences in the commercial category for the best single-spot award for "Bridge" and best campaign award for "Abduction/Rescue", part of the Trunk Monkey campaign.

References

Advertising agencies of the United States
Companies based in Portland, Oregon
Privately held companies based in Oregon
1997 establishments in Oregon